The 2019 IIHF World Championship Division III was an international ice hockey tournament run by the International Ice Hockey Federation.

The Group A tournament was held in Sofia, Bulgaria from 22 to 28 April and the qualification tournament in Abu Dhabi, United Arab Emirates from 31 March to 6 April 2019. Both Kyrgyzstan and Thailand made their debut in the World Championships, with each winning their first game (Kyrgyzstan won all five of its games, but the first four were changed to forfeits due to an ineligible player).

Bulgaria earned promotion to Division II, while the United Arab Emirates won the qualification tournament and were promoted. South Africa finished last and were demoted to the qualification tournament.

Division III

Participants

Match officials
4 referees and 7 linesmen were selected for the tournament.

Standings

Results
All times are local (UTC+3).

Awards and statistics

Awards
Best players selected by the directorate:
Best Goalkeeper:  Dimitar Dimitrov
Best Defenseman:  Shen Yen-lin
Best Forward:  Miroslav Vasilev
Source: IIHF.com

Scoring leaders
List shows the top skaters sorted by points, then goals.

GP = Games played; G = Goals; A = Assists; Pts = Points; +/− = Plus/minus; PIM = Penalties in minutes; POS = Position
Source: IIHF.com

Goaltending leaders
Only the top five goaltenders, based on save percentage, who have played at least 40% of their team's minutes, are included in this list.

TOI = Time on ice (minutes:seconds); SA = Shots against; GA = Goals against; GAA = Goals against average; Sv% = Save percentage; SO = Shutouts
Source: IIHF.com

Division III qualification tournament

Participants

Match officials
4 referees and 7 linesmen were selected for the tournament.

Standings

Results
All times are local (UTC+4).
Kyrgyzstan played its first four games, all wins, with Russian born player Aleksandr Titov in their lineup. Before their final game, also a win, when it was found that Titov was not yet eligible to play for Kyrgyzstan, he was disqualified from the tournament and Kyrgyzstan forfeited their first four games.

Statistics
All statistics from Kyrgyzstan's first four games were not counted by the IIHF, including their opponents scoring and goaltending details.

Scoring leaders
List shows the top skaters sorted by points, then goals.

GP = Games played; G = Goals; A = Assists; Pts = Points; +/− = Plus/minus; PIM = Penalties in minutes; POS = Position
Source: IIHF.com
Kyrgyz players Vladimir Nosov (23 points), Vladimir Tonkikh (16), Mikhail Chuvalov (16), Islambek Abdyraev (10) and Maksim Egorov (10) do not appear in this list because their statistics from their first four games were deemed invalid.

Goaltending leaders
Only the top five goaltenders, based on save percentage, who have played at least 40% of their team's minutes, are included in this list.

TOI = Time on ice (minutes:seconds); SA = Shots against; GA = Goals against; GAA = Goals against average; Sv% = Save percentage; SO = Shutouts
Source: IIHF.com

References

External links
Official website
Qualification website

2019
Division III
2019 IIHF World Championship Division III
2019 IIHF World Championship Division III
Sports competitions in Sofia
Sports competitions in Abu Dhabi
2019 in Bulgarian sport
2019 in Emirati sport
March 2019 sports events in Asia
April 2019 sports events in Asia
April 2019 sports events in Europe